Shanti Niketan Vidyapeeth, Hisar is a non-profit private trust run group of several educational institutes located in Ladwa village on Tosham road near Hisar in the Indian state of Haryana.

Location
It lies on Hisar-Tosham road to the east of the college.

Institutes
The vidyapeeth has following colleges:
 Shanti Niketan College of Engineering
 Shanti Niketan Institute of Engineering & Technology
 SD Shanti Niketan Institute of Engineering & Technology
 Shanti Niketan College of Education
 Shanti Niketan College

Courses 
The college offers undergraduate and post-graduate courses in arts, science, commerce, business, computer and electronics.

 Shanti Niketan College of Engineering
 M.Tech. Computer Science Engineering
 M.Tech. Mechanical Engineering
 B.Tech. Computer Science Engineering
 B.Tech. Elecetronics & Comm. Engineering
 B.Tech. Mechanical Engineering
 B.Tech. Civil Engineering
 B.Tech. Information Technology
 Shanti Niketan Institute of Engineering & Technology
 Diploma in Computer Science
 Diploma in Electrical Engineering
 Diploma in Electronics & Comm. Engineering
 Diploma in Mechanical Engineering
 SD Shanti Niketan Institute of Engineering & Technology
 Diploma in Computer Science
 Diploma in Civil Engineering
 Diploma in Electronics & Comm. Engineering
 Diploma in Mechanical Engineering
 Shanti Niketan College of Education
 M.Ed.
 B.Ed.
 D.Ed.
 Shanti Niketan College
 B.Sc.
 B.Com.
 B.A.

See also 
 Visva-Bharati University at Shantiniketan in West Bengal established by Rabindranath Tagore
 Hisar district
 List of Universities and Colleges in Hisar
 List of schools in Hisar
 List of institutions of higher education in Haryana

External links 
 
 
 Shanti Niketan Vidyapeeth Youtube intro
 Shanti Niketan Vidyapeeth Google map

References 

Hisar (city)
Universities and colleges in Hisar (city)